Hugo Muñoz Llerena (born 10 January 1973) is a retired Peruvian high jumper. He competed in the 1996 (Atlanta) and 2000 (Sydney) Olympic Games as a member of the Peru National Team without reaching the finals.

Career
He won the gold medal at the 1993 South American Championships. He also competed at the 1993 World Championships, the 1996 Olympic Games and the 2000 Olympic Games without reaching the final.

His personal best jump is 2.30 meters, achieved in October 1995 in Lima.

Achievements

References

sports-reference

1973 births
Living people
Peruvian male high jumpers
Athletes (track and field) at the 1996 Summer Olympics
Athletes (track and field) at the 2000 Summer Olympics
Olympic athletes of Peru
South American Games silver medalists for Peru
South American Games medalists in athletics
Competitors at the 1990 South American Games
Competitors at the 1994 South American Games
Athletes (track and field) at the 1995 Pan American Games
Pan American Games competitors for Peru
20th-century Peruvian people